The 2015 NCAA Division III Women's Soccer Championship is the 30th annual single-elimination tournament to determine the national champion of NCAA Division III women's collegiate soccer in the United States. The semifinals and championship game will be played at Swope Soccer Village in Kansas City, Missouri (the home field of Swope Park Rangers, the USL affiliate of MLS's Sporting Kansas City) from December 4–5, 2015 while the preceding rounds will be played at various sites across the country during November 2015.

Qualification
All Division III women's soccer programs were eligible to qualify for the 64-team tournament field. 44 teams received automatic bids by winning their conference tournaments and an additional 20 teams earned at-large bids based on their regular season records. ALl first and second-round games are played on campus sites while all third and fourth-round games, deemed Sectionals, will be played on the home field of the highest-seeded remaining team of that sectional.

Automatic qualifiers (44)

At-large qualifiers (20)

Tournament bracket

Messiah Sectional

Washington–St. Louis Sectional

Carnegie Mellon Sectional

William Smith Sectional

Division III Women's College Cup

See also 
 NCAA Women's Soccer Championships (Division I, Division II)
 NCAA Men's Soccer Championships (Division I, Division II, Division II)

References

NCAA
2015 in sports in Missouri
Soccer in Missouri